Robert Belmont (1892-1953) was a French lawyer and politician. He served as a member of the French Senate from 1933 to 1941, representing Isère.

References

1892 births
1953 deaths
People from Bourgoin-Jallieu
French Senators of the Third Republic
Senators of Isère